"Happy Anniversary" is a song by Slim Whitman.

In the UK, where this song was released as a single (coupled with "What I Had with You"), it charted for ten weeks in October–December 1974, peaking at number 14.

In the United States, it did not receive a commercial single release.

The song gave its title to Whitman's 1974 album Happy Anniversary

Writing 
The song was written by Gary S. Paxton.

Track listing

Charts

References 

1974 songs
1974 singles
United Artists Records singles
Slim Whitman songs
Songs written by Gary S. Paxton